Joseph Robinson Darling (1872 - September 7, 1957) was a special agent of the United States Department of Justice, author, promoter, explorer, and soldier of fortune.

Biography
He prepared two government cases against the Bathtub Trust, International Harvester, and Motion Picture Patents Company. On January 1, 1914, he resigned from the Department of Justice to enter business. In 1915 he wrote "Darling on Trusts" a legal treatise. He died in Miami, Florida on September 6, 1957.

Publications
Darling on Trusts (1915)

References

United States Department of Justice officials
1872 births
1957 deaths